Löwenberg is a surname, meaning "lion mountain" in the German language. Notable people named Löwenberg include:

Bob Löwenberg, Dutch hematologist
Daniela Löwenberg (1988), German football midfielder

Jewish surnames
German-language surnames
Yiddish-language surnames
Swedish-language surnames
German toponymic surnames